The 2009–10 season was the 41st campaign of the Scottish Men's National League, the national basketball league of Scotland. The season featured 6 teams. There were no end-of-season playoffs. City of Edinburgh Kings won their 7th league title.

Teams

The line-up for the 2009-2010 season featured the following teams:

City of Edinburgh Kings
Clark Eriksson Fury
East Lothian Peregrines
Glasgow Storm
St Mirren Reid Kerr College
Troon Tornadoes

League table

References

Scottish Basketball Championship Men seasons
Scot
Scot
basketball
basketball